Putanges-Pont-Écrepin is a village and a former commune in the Orne département of north-western France. On 1 January 2016, it was merged into the new commune of Putanges-le-Lac.

Heraldry

See also

Communes of the Orne department

References 

Former communes of Orne